Super 3D Noah's Ark is a Christian video game developed by Wisdom Tree for the Super Nintendo Entertainment System, and was ported a year later to MS-DOS, and re-released in 2015 on Steam for Microsoft Windows, Mac OS X, and Linux. The game was an officially licensed id Software Wolfenstein 3D engine title, but was not licensed by Nintendo, so it was sold in Christian bookstores instead of typical video game retailers.

Gameplay

The game plays similarly to Wolfenstein 3D, but the graphics were changed to reflect a non-violent theme. Instead of killing Nazi soldiers in a castle, the player takes the part of Noah, wandering the Ark, using a slingshot to shoot sleep-inducing food at angry attacking animals, mostly goats, in order to render them unconscious. The animals behave differently: goats, the most common enemy, will only kick Noah, while the other animals such as sheep, ostriches, antelopes and oxen will shoot spittle at him from a distance. Goats are also unable to open doors, while the other animals can.

The gameplay is aimed at younger children. Noah's Ark includes secret passages, food, weapons and extra lives. There are secret levels, and shortcut levels as well. The player eventually comes across larger and more powerful slingshots, and flings coconuts and watermelon at the larger boss-like animals, such as Ernie the Elephant and Carl the Camel.

Development
The game that would eventually become Super 3D Noah's Ark was originally conceived as a licensed game based on the movie Hellraiser, a movie that Wisdom Tree founder Dan Lawton was a great fan of. Wisdom Tree acquired the game rights to Hellraiser for $50,000, along with a license to use the Wolfenstein 3D game engine from id Software, believing that the fast, violent action of Wolfenstein would be a good match for the mood of the film. Development initially began on the Nintendo Entertainment System, with Wisdom Tree intending to ship the game on a special cartridge that came equipped with a co-processor that could increase the system's RAM and processing speed several times over.

Eventually the Hellraiser game concept was abandoned due to several issues: the hardware of the NES was found unsuitable because of its low color palette and the addition of a co-processor would have made the cartridge far too expensive for consumers. According to Vance Kozik of Wisdom Tree, little progress was made on the NES incarnation of the game, which he described as "a barely up-and-running demo". The platform for Hellraiser was then switched to the PC, and the developers were able to make more progress on this version. However, by the time the first prototype was finished, Doom had been released, and Wisdom Tree felt that Hellraiser would not be able to compete. In addition, the management at Wisdom Tree decided that developing and publishing a horror-themed game would clash with their religious, family-friendly image. With these factors in mind, Wisdom Tree decided to let their Hellraiser license expire, transfer development to the Super Nintendo Entertainment System, and redesign the game with a Christian theme, eventually coming up with a game about Noah's Ark.

As the game was not officially sanctioned by Nintendo, Wisdom Tree devised a pass-through system similar to the Game Genie to bypass the system's copy protection, where the player had to insert an officially licensed SNES game into the cartridge slot on top of the Super 3D Noah's Ark cartridge.

A popular rumor claims that id Software licensed the Wolfenstein 3D engine to Wisdom Tree in retaliation against Nintendo for the content restrictions Nintendo placed on the Super NES version of Wolfenstein 3D. In actuality, Wisdom Tree offered id Software very lucrative terms for the Wolfenstein 3D game engine, which id regarded as having already outlived its usefulness, and id staff have stated that they never had any problems with Nintendo in the first place.

Re-release
In January 2014, the game was re-released for the SNES, initially available only by private email orders, but later through Piko Interactive's website. The game was also updated for the 20th Anniversary Edition and released on itch.io on May 26 the same year for Windows, Mac OS X, and Linux. These modern PC re-releases are based on the ECWolf game engine, a derivative of Wolfenstein 3D and ZDoom.

See also
Chex Quest
Christian media

References

External links
  - Wisdom Tree Games - Christian and Family oriented video games and video game products.
  - Super 3D Noah's Ark of Wisdom Tree Games at itch.io
  -  old official game website of Wisdom Tree Games
 
 

1994 video games
Christian video games
Commercial video games with freely available source code
DOS games
Linux games
MacOS games
Noah's Ark in popular culture
North America-exclusive video games
Piko Interactive games
Single-player video games
Sprite-based first-person shooters
Super Nintendo Entertainment System games
Unauthorized video games
Video games based on the Bible
Video games developed in the United States
Windows games
Wisdom Tree games
Wolfenstein 3D engine games